Julia L. Newton is Clinical Professor of Ageing and Medicine and Dean for Clinical Medicine at the School of Clinical Medical Sciences of Newcastle University in Newcastle upon Tyne, England. She is Director of MD Studies in the Faculty of Medical Sciences at Newcastle, and a member of the Pharmacogenomics & Complex Disease Genetics Research Group

She has worked on a wide range of research programmes. Her published research has been chiefly on the autonomic nervous system and its relation to disease especially in primary biliary cirrhosis. Newton's current interests are focused on how fatigue develops, and she proposes "postural orthostatic tachycardia syndrome" as significant in a subset of patients with M.E./C.F.S. chronic fatigue syndrome. She has also worked to establish a link between autonomic dysfunction and muscle fatigue linking POTS with abnormal muscle PH and proton efflux.

Biography
She received her MB, BS with Honours in 1990, and a Diploma of Medical Science: 1995. Her PhD was awarded in 1998. She obtained certification in CCST Geriatric Medicine and General Internal Medicine: 2000, and became a Fellow of the Royal College of Physicians FRCP(UK) in 2003.

She was previously 
2000 to 2006: Consultant Geriatrician, Royal Victoria Infirmary, Newcastle and Honorary Senior Lecturer in General and Geriatric Medicine, University of Newcastle
1998 to 2000: Specialist Registrar in Geriatric and General Internal Medicine, Northern Deanery
1995 to 1998: Clinical Research Associate, Department of Physiological Sciences, University of Newcastle

Memberships
 Secretary of the British Geriatric Society Special Interest Group in Gastroenterology and Nutrition.
 Fellow of the Royal College of Physicians

Honours
European Association for the Study of the Liver, Travel Fellowship, 2002.

Selected scientific publications

Newton JL, Allen J, Kerr S, Jones DE. "Reduced heart rate variability and baroreflex sensitivity in primary biliary cirrhosis.

References

External links
Official University web page

21st-century British medical doctors
British women medical doctors
Fellows of the Royal College of Physicians
Living people
Place of birth missing (living people)
Year of birth missing (living people)
Alumni of Newcastle University
Academics of Newcastle University
21st-century women physicians
21st-century British women writers
British medical writers